104 Films is a film production company founded by director Justin Edgar and producer Alex Usborne in 2004. They specialise in the representation of disabled and disadvantaged talent, both on screen and behind the camera.
The first feature film released by 104 Films was 2001's Large. They have since produced various short films. In 2007 they released the feature film Special People. The feature film We Are the Freaks premiered at the 2013 Edinburgh Film Festival, competing for the Michael Powell Award.

In September 2013 the British Film Institute unveiled a £3m annual talent support network, through which they are working with 104 Films to support emerging filmmakers with disabilities.

104 Films co-produced the acclaimed feature documentary Notes on Blindness on the blind academic and theologian John M. Hull. The film premiered at the 2016 Sundance Film and won an Emmy in November 2015. They also produced Battlelines, a drama about deaf soldiers in WW1 which was shown at the imperial war museum film festival and won a Royal Television Society Award.

Currently they are in production on Justin Edgar's fourth feature film The Marker, starring John Hannah and backed by Creative England.

Productions

References

External links 

104 Films

Film production companies of the United Kingdom
Disability in the arts